Celia M. Burleigh  (September 18, 1826 – July 25, 1875) (also Celia Burleigh, Celia C. Burleigh, Celia M. Tibbitts, Celia M. Kellum, Celia M. Burr, and Celia C. Burr Burleigh) was an American minister, writer, public speaker, and women's rights activist.  She was involved with the woman's club movement and held various positions in women's rights clubs.

Biography 

Burleigh was born at Cazenovia, New York, on September 18, 1826. She was the adopted child of Henry and Sara Tibbitts. She received her initial childhood schooling at a one-room school house a mile from her home. When she was sixteen she became a teacher at Cazenovia Seminary.  Burleigh married Corydon Bryant Kellum of Albany, New York in 1844 when she was eighteen and they moved to Cincinnati, Ohio.  The couple had two children who died young. In 1849 Burleigh became an editor of a journal called The Great West and worked at that for about a year. She divorced Kellum in 1850 and moved to New York City.

Burleigh then developed a relationship with Charles Chauncey Burr and married him in 1851. She wrote for newspapers and magazines using the pen name "Celia Burr." She also was a lyricist and published a few songs in collaboration with some musicians. The marriage to Burr ended in 1853. Starting in 1855 she served as a director for a boarding school. Later she became a teacher in Syracuse, New York. There she also wrote articles for the Christian Register and lectured on women's suffrage.

In 1862 Burleigh accepted a position as personal secretary for the educator Emma Willard, who was then 75. In 1864, she had developed a relationship with social activist William Henry Burleigh, a New York City harbor master. She had initially met him in 1850 in Syracuse. They married on September 7, 1865. They were close to the Second Unitarian Society minister, John White Chadwick. Later the Burleighs separated, but both continued to live in Brooklyn, New York. He continued as a harbor master and she took up a career in journalism.

Burleigh in 1868 was one of the founding members of Sorosis and became its main fund-raiser and lecturer. The society was formed in protest to one of her associates being excluded from an all men's press club dinner. The organization consisted of twelve women that wanted to promote deeper association between women writers and artists. She helped organize the Brooklyn Woman's Club in 1869, becoming its first president. She served as secretary for the American Equal Rights Association in early 1870. Burleigh stood on the platform at the Convention of the Northwestern Woman's Suffrage Association alongside Susan B. Anthony. She was a public speaker and activist for women's rights.

Burleigh picked up an interest in ministry.  She was invited to be the summer minister at the Unitarian church of Brooklyn, Connecticut in July 1871. She developed a strong following in a short time and was asked to stay on as their permanent minister. Burleigh became the first woman pastor ordained into the Unitarian ministry. She was ordained and given the parish in Brooklyn on October 5, 1871. Among those officiating at the ordination were Reverend John Chadwick and Julia Ward Howe. In 1873 she resigned from the ministry because of poor health due to breast cancer. Burleigh spent her last days in Syracuse and died there on July 27, 1875. She is buried at the city's South Cemetery.

References

Sources 

1826 births
1875 deaths
People from Cazenovia, New York
Activists from New York (state)
American feminists
American suffragists
American temperance activists
American Unitarians
American women's rights activists
Clubwomen
Proponents of Christian feminism